Disney Junior is a Scandinavian television channel owned and operated by The Walt Disney Company Limited; targeted for preschoolers targeting the Nordic countries. It does not screen advertising and is funded by subscriptions instead.

It was launched in 2006 on the Canal Digital and Viasat satellite platforms. Cable networks launched it later on. Com Hem, the largest cable network in Sweden, launched it on April 2, 2007. Before September 10, 2011, this channel was called Playhouse Disney, the last show as Playhouse Disney was Special Agent Oso at 6:30 PM. In October 12, 2012, a Russian audio track was added. It currently time shifts with V Series from 6 AM to 7 PM. The network closed on Allente on 28 February 2023,.

References

External links

 Disney Junior Gateway

Pan-Nordic television channels
Television stations in Denmark
Television channels in Norway
Television channels in Sweden
2006 establishments in Denmark
2006 establishments in Finland
2006 establishments in Norway
2006 establishments in Sweden
Television channels and stations established in 2006
Children's television networks
Scadinavia
Television channel articles with incorrect naming style
Television channels in Lithuania
Television channels in Estonia
Television channels in Latvia
2006 establishments in Lithuania
2006 establishments in Estonia
2006 establishments in Latvia